Aarau railway station serves the municipality of Aarau, capital town of the canton of Aargau, Switzerland. Opened in 1856, it is owned and operated by Swiss Federal Railways (SBB CFF FFS).

The station forms the junction between the Olten–Aarau railway, the Zurich-Aarau railway and the Baden–Aarau railway. Previously, it was also a terminus of the now closed Aarau–Suhr railway.

On the southern side of the station yard is the separate railway station Aarau WSB for the metre gauge trains of the Menziken–Aarau–Schöftland line of Aargau Verkehr AG (AVA). Its infrastructure (its own station building, 2 platforms serving three tracks, no. 11–13) is directly connected with Aarau railway station.

Location
Aarau railway station is situated in the Bahnhofstrasse, at the south eastern edge of the old town.
== Rail traffic ==

Long-distance 
The following long-distance services call at Aarau:
 InterRegio:
 hourly service between Bern and Zürich Hauptbahnhof.
 hourly service between Basel SBB and Zürich Hauptbahnhof.
 RegioExpress:
 hourly service between Olten and Wettingen.
 hourly service to Zürich Hauptbahnhof.

S-Bahn

Aargau S-Bahn 
The station is the focal point of the Aargau S-Bahn network, and is served by the following lines of that network:

Zürich S-Bahn 
There is also a Zürich S-Bahn line that originates and terminates at Aargau:

Notes

References

External links
 
 
 Interactive station plan (Aarau)

Railway stations in Switzerland opened in 1856
Railway station
Railway stations in the canton of Aargau
Swiss Federal Railways stations